Cistm Konfliqt... ("system conflict") is the tenth and last studio album by Japanese band The Mad Capsule Markets. It was released in 2004 in Japan and 2005 in the United Kingdom. The UK version included two bonus live tracks, a video for "W.O.R.L.D", and an alternative cover. This lyrics showed an interest in politics, for example the song "Scary" has the lines "Tell me now, why are we killing and dying; America, Europe, Asia, Middle East; Religion, History, Greed".

After the album's release, the band was invited to The Radio One Lock Up show to play a session, and the song "Cracker!" was featured on the Japanese version of the Resident Evil: Apocalypse soundtrack. Former Pride FC Champion Takanori Gomi uses the song "Scary" as his entrance music.

Track listing
Start ID – 0:12
Retalk – 3:30
Bomb Idea – 2:20
Scary (Delete Streamin' Freq. from Fear Side) – 3:57
W.O.R.L.D. – 4:25
クラッカー!!! (Cracker!!!) – 3:48
Sunny Beach Rd. – 3:12
Grim Monster – 3:21
Loud Up! – 2:44
She Loves It (Explore the New Day) – 3:38
Let It Rip (Download from Joujouka) – 4:50
Happy Ride – 3:11
Cistm Konfliqt... – 4:21
Pulse [Live] – 3:23 (UK release only)
Island [Live] – 5:15 (UK release only) 
W.O.R.L.D [Video] (UK release only)

"Let It Rip (Download from Joujouka)" is a remake of the psychedelic trance band Joujouka's song "Let It Rip".

The Mad Capsule Markets albums
2004 albums